Waverly, Virginia, is a town. The name may also refer to:

 Waverly, Caroline County, Virginia, an unincorporated community
 Waverly (Burnt Chimney, Virginia), a home and farm listed on the National Register of Historic Places
 Waverly (Leesburg, Virginia), a mansion listed on the National Register of Historic Places
 Waverly (Middleburg, Virginia), a historic house listed on the National Register of Historic Places